The Ministry of Electricity (Arabic: وزارة الكهرباء) is a department of the Government of Syria. The ministry is responsible for managing the electric energy and renewable energy sector in Syria, and a number of governmental institutions and companies are affiliated to it.

In Syria, the production of electricity has been entirely nationalized. By the end of the 1990s, the Ministry of Electricity managed 74,9% of the production of electricity nationwide. The country was planning to become self-sufficient in electricity supply by 1998. For this reason, the Ministry never seriously considered renewable energies Because they take a longer time to deploy. By 2010, the government encouraged private investors to develop the electric capacity of the country, but the war broke out.

In November 2021, the Ministry of Electricity annulled dozens of renewable energy licences.

Ministers

See also 
 Council of Ministers (Syria)

References 

Ministries established in 1974
Government ministries of Syria
Energy ministries
Energy in Syria
Organizations based in Damascus